The International GT Open is a grand tourer-style sports car racing series founded in 2006 by the Spanish GT Sport Organización.  It was a spin-off of the now-defunct Spanish GT Championship, but is now a distinct series featuring FIA GT3-spec cars modified from production road cars.

Format
The series consists of events in various European countries which feature two races over a weekend.  In its first year, the races had an identical format to the Spanish GT Championship, with two 200 km races, the first held on Saturday and the second the following Sunday. Three of the six rounds were joint events for the Open and the Spanish GT Championship.

In 2007, the first race, known as Pro-Am, covers approximately 200 km distance, while the second race is 150 km and known as GT Open. The only exception is the Open GT Barcelona, which is a single 300 km race. In early seasons, a few races have been a part of the World Touring Car Championship support package.

Now the first race of a weekend is 70 minutes long and the second is 60 minutes. The current support series are the Euroformula Open Championship (formerly Spanish F3 Open) and the GT Cup Open Europe with some race weekends also featuring TCR Europe and the Alpine Elf Europa Cup.

Past support series have included the SEAT León Supercopa (2014-2016), and Formula V8 3.5 Series (2016).

Regulations
Each race consists of a field of grand touring-style cars broken into different classes based on power and weight.  For 2006, two classes were used, known as GTA and GTB.  GTA was equivalent to the GT2 class used in the FIA GT Championship, but it also allowed non-homologated cars provide they obey the FIA GT2 technical regulations. Most of the field was made up of Ferrari F430 GTs and Porsche 911 GT3-RSRs. Non-homologated cars like the Mosler MT900R and the SEAT Cupra GT were also competitive.

The GTB class consisted of cars usually from a manufacturer's one-make cup series, like the Ferrari F430 Challenge, the Porsche 911 GT3 Cup, and the Marcos Mantis.  A GTS class was created to house the FIA GT3 class, consisting mainly of Dodge Viper Competition Coupes and Lamborghini Gallardo GT3s. 

Starting in 2015, the International GT Open began using only FIA GT3-spec cars with 2 sub-categories. The Am category is only for drivers given the "Bronze" designation by GT Sport. Pro-Am requires one Bronze driver with no restrictions on the co-driver. All other entries are scored overall with the only driver restriction being a ban on having two Platinum drivers.

Champions

Drivers

Current categories

Overall

GT3 PRO-AM

† Title won on number of wins count back.

GT3 AM

Defunct categories

GTA

GTB

GTS

Super GT

Gentleman’s Cup

GT Open Cup

Teams

References

External links

 International GT Open Official website

 
Group GT3